Landmark North is an office tower-and-shopping centre complex in Sheung Shui, Hong Kong. It was developed by Sun Hung Kai Properties and is located in the commercial centre of Sheung Shui.

Location
Landmark North is situated at 39 Lung Sum Avenue in Sheung Shui. A footbridge connects it with Sheung Shui station. Landmark North is connected to Metropolis Plaza by a footbridge. The three other main shopping centres in Sheung Shui, Sheung Shui Centre, Sheung Shui Town Centre, and Lung Fung Plaza together with Metropolis Plaza and Landmark North form a large shopping complex in the heart of Sheung Shui, just by Sheung Shui station.

Shops
There are many different types of shops and other services in Landmark North, below are lists of some notable shops.

Food
Aji Ichiban, Fairwood, Tai Hing, 牛摩 hot pot restaurant, Wing Wah Cake Shop, Saint Honore Cake Shop, Maxim Hong Kong Day

Fashion and Sport
Baleno, Bauhaus, G2000, HOSO Place, Mirabell, Walker Shop

Jewellery
Chow Sang Sang, Chow Tai Fook, Just Gold, Luk Fook Jewellery, Mabelle, My Jewelry (in Chinese)

Travel Agencies
Wing On Travel Services

Other shops
Eu Yan Sang, The Body Shop, The Commercial Press, OSIM

Nearby facilities
North District Town Hall
Shek Wu Hui Wet Market
Shek Wu Hui Municipal Services Building
Sheung Shui Public Library

External links

 Official website

Sheung Shui
North District, Hong Kong
Shopping centres in Hong Kong
Sun Hung Kai Properties